Ratsey & Lapthorn is a British sail making company based in Cowes on the Isle of Wight, England and they had a loft in the United States. The loft was on Schofield Street on City Island, in the Bronx. It is one of the oldest and largest sail maker in the United States.

History
The company was established in 1796. The United States branch was established in 1902. In 1958 Franklin Ratsey was chairman of the board.

External links

References

City Island, Bronx
Sailmakers
British companies established in 1796
1796 establishments in England
Manufacturing companies established in 1796